Lobanovo may refer to:
Lobanove, village in Crimea
Lobanovo, Russia, several rural localities in Russia
Lobanovo, Kazakhstan, a village in Aiyrtau District, North Kazakhstan Region

See also
 Lobanov